Sport Toplumy Stadium is a multi-purpose stadium in Mary, Turkmenistan.  It is currently used mostly for football matches and serves as the home stadium for FC Merw. The stadium holds 10,000 people.

History 
The sports complex opened in May 2009. First match was between FC Merw and afghan FC Esteghlal Herat (6:0). Construction works carried out by Turkish company Kılıç İnşaat . The project cost $20 million.

References

External links
 Stadium pictures
 Video from stadium

Football venues in Turkmenistan
Multi-purpose stadiums in Turkmenistan
2009 establishments in Turkmenistan
Sports venues completed in 2009